Aquilino may refer to the following people:
Given name
Aquilino Bonfanti (1943–2016), Italian football midfielder
Aquilino Boyd (1921–2004), Panamanian politician and diplomat
Aquilino Coppini (died 1629), Italian musician and lyricist
Aquilino López (born 1975), American baseball player 
Aquilino Pimentel (disambiguation), Filipino politicians
Aquilino Ribeiro (1885–1963), Portuguese writer and diplomat
Aquilino Villalba (born 1983), Paraguayan football striker 

Surname
Carly Aquilino (born 1990), American stand-up comedian, actress, television host and television personality 
John C. Aquilino, United States Navy admiral
Nicolas Aquilino (born 1953), Filipino boxer 
Thomas J. Aquilino (born 1939), Judge for the United States Court of International Trade